Hormozd Jadhuyih was a Sasanian commander who is known for his participation at the Battle of Firaz during the Arab invasion of Iran, which resulted in Byzantine-Sasanian defeat. According to al-Tabari, Hormozd's army during the battle consisted of "keepers of chickens and swine." Hormozd may have been the father of the prominent Sasanian general Bahman Jadhuyih, who was already recorded as an old man by 634. Thus Hormozd was probably an old man during the Battle of Firaz.

Sources 

Generals of Yazdegerd III
7th-century deaths
6th-century births
7th-century Iranian people